Kelavli is a railway station on the Central line of the Mumbai Suburban Railway network. It is on the Karjat–Khopoli route. Palasdari is the previous station and Dolavli is the next station. Kelavli lies on Karjat–Khopoli State Highway 35.

Mumbai Suburban Railway stations
Railway stations in Raigad district
Karjat-Khopoli rail line